Gomphus kinzelbachi is a species of dragonfly in the family Gomphidae. It is found in Iran and Iraq. Its natural habitat is rivers. It is threatened by habitat loss.

References

Gomphidae
Taxonomy articles created by Polbot
Insects described in 1984